The 2015 Philadelphia City Council election took place on November 3, 2015, along with the 2015 Philadelphia mayoral election. The composition of the Philadelphia City Council remained unchanged from before the election, with Democrats maintaining their 13-3 majority on the council.

References 

2015 United States local elections
2015 Pennsylvania elections
Philadelphia City Council elections